John William Mackel (December 28, 1912 – May 5, 1986) was an American jazz guitarist.

Mackel was born in Baltimore, Maryland. He played banjo early in his career, but like many banjoists of his time he switched to guitar.  He led his own band early in the 1940s, then joined Lionel Hampton in 1944 and spent the next thirty years with him. In the 1940s he also recorded with Milt Buckner, Arnett Cobb, Herbie Fields, and others, and worked with Billy Williams in the 1960s. He played left-handed.

Discography
 At Last with Eddie Chamblee, Milt Buckner, Michel Gaudry, Frankie Dunlop (Black & Blue, 1977)

References

Further reading
 Barry Kernfeld, ed., The New Grove Dictionary of Jazz. 2nd edition. Oxford, 2002, pp. 662–663.

1912 births
1986 deaths
American jazz guitarists
Guitarists from Maryland
20th-century American guitarists
American male guitarists
Jazz musicians from Maryland
20th-century American male musicians
American male jazz musicians